Sakmongkol Sithchuchok (born 6 July 1973)  is a Thai super middleweight Muay Thai-kickboxer. Sakmongkol is considered one of the most legendary Muay Thai fighters of all time, defeating other Muay Thai greats as Ramon Dekkers, Dany Bill, Perry Ubeda, John Wayne Parr, Jongsanan Fairtex. His record stands at 231 wins, 4 draws, and 20 losses. He is a 5 time WMC World Champion and a 3 time Lumpinee Stadium Champion.

Biography and career

Sakmongkol was a champion in the 1990s, considered to be the Muay Thai "Golden Era". He is known for his devastating left kicks and tough body that could take a lot of punishment while still able to continue to push the fight forward. He started training at 6 years old, and had his first fight when he was 8. He made it to Lumpinee Stadium at the age of 12.  At age 18 he fought and defeated the Dutch legend, Rammon Dekkers. His most famous battles, a total of 7 fights, were against Jongsanan Fairtex. Their fifth fight became known as the "Elbow Fight" and is considered one of the most brutal and best Muay Thai fights of all time. Monghukon is currently the head coach of UAE national Muaythai (IFMA) team.

Titles and accomplishments
Lumpinee Stadium
 1993 Lumpinee Stadium Fight of the Year (vs Jongsanan Fairtex)
 1994 Lumpinee Stadium 135 lbs Champion
 1996 Beer Chang Tournament Runner-up

Sports Writers Association of Thailand
 1996 Fight of the Year (vs Pairot Wor Walapon)
 1998 Fight of the Year (vs Orono Por Muang Ubon)
 1999 Fight of the Year (vs Perry Ubeda)

World Professional Kickboxing League
 1999 WPKL Middleweight World Champion
World Muay Thai Council
 1996 WMTC Middleweight World Champion

Fight record

|-
|-  bgcolor="#CCFFCC"
| 2014-10-19 || Win||align=left|Go Yokoyama || WKO: Kumite Energy || Osaka, Japan ||KO  || 2 || 
|-
|-  style="background:#cfc;"
| 2011-08-20 || Win ||align=left| Cosmo Alexandre || Battle in the Desert 3 || Nevada, United States || Decision (Unanimous) || 5 || 3:00
|-  style="background:#cfc;"
| 2011-06-25 || Win ||align=left| Jamez Martinez || Ring of Fire Muay Thai Mayhem || United States || TKO (Broken arm) || 3 || 
|-  style="background:#fbb;"
| 2007-02-17 || Loss ||align=left| Abdallah Mabel || La Nuit des Titans II || Tours, France || Decision || 5 || 3:00
|-  style="background:#cfc;"
| 2006-11-26 || Win ||align=left| Peter Crooke || Muay Thai Super Fights || Wolverhampton, England || Decision (Unanimous) || 5 || 3:00 
|-  style="background:#cfc;"
| 2004-12-18 || Win ||align=left| John Wayne Parr || K-1 Challenge 2004 Oceania vs World || Gold Coast, Australia || Decision(Split) || 5(Ex.2) || 3:00
|-  style="background:#cfc;"
| 2003-11-12 || Win ||align=left| Morad Sari ||  || Dubai, United Arab Emirates || Decision (Unanimous) || 12 || 2:00
|-  style="background:#fbb;"
| 2003-11-08 || Loss ||align=left| Farid Villaume ||  || Tieste, Italy || Decision (Unanimous) || 5 || 3:00
|-
! style=background:white colspan=9 |
|-
|-  style="text-align:center; background:#fbb;"
| 2003-04-18 || Loss ||align=left| Morad Sari ||Le Grand Tournoi  || Paris, France || Decision (Unanimous) || 3 || 3:00
|-  style="background:#cfc;"
| 2003-04-18 || Win ||align=left| Joseph Yaucat Guendi ||Le Grand Tournoi  || Paris, France || Decision (Unanimous) || 3 || 3:00
|-  style="background:#fbb;"
| 2003-02-16 || Loss ||align=left| Stjepan Veselic ||  || Rotterdam, Netherlands || TKO (Broken nose) || 2 || 
|-
! style=background:white colspan=9 |
|-  style="background:#fbb;"
| 2002-09-07 || Loss ||align=left| Zheng Yusong || Chinese Kung Fu vs Muaythai || Guangzhou, China || Decision (Unanimous) || 5 || 
|-  style="background:#cfc;"
| 2002-06-01 || Win ||align=left| Perry Ubeda  ||  || Marseille, France || Abandon || 5 || 2:00

|-  style="background:#cfc;"
| 2001-07-13 || Win ||align=left| Kengo Yamagami  || MAJKF KICK GUTS || Tokyo, Japan || Decision || 5 || 3:00

|-  style="background:#fbb;"
| 2001-03-24 || Loss ||align=left| Pajonsuk SuperPro Samui || Lumpinee Stadium || Bangkok, Thailand || Decision  || 5 || 3:00

|-  style="background:#cfc;"
| 2000-03-18 || Win ||align=left| Perry Ubeda || || Las Vegas, Nevada, USA || Disqualification (Illegal elbow) || 4 || 
|-  style="background:#cfc;"
| 1999-12-05 || Win ||align=left| Perry Ubeda || Kings Birthday 1999 || Bangkok, Thailand || TKO (Broken arm) || 5 || 0:22
|-  style="background:#cfc;"
| 1999-10-30 || Win ||align=left| Hassan Ettaki || Night of Sensation || Rotterdam, Netherlands || Decision (Unanimous) || 5 || 3:00
|-
! style=background:white colspan=9 |
|-  style="background:#cfc;"
| 1999-08-12 || Win ||align=left| Rayen Simson|| Queen's Birthday Show || Nonthaburi, Thailand || Decision (Unanimous) || 5 || 3:00
|-  style="background:#fbb;"
|-  style="background:#cfc;"
| 1999-03-06 || Win ||align=left| Kriengkrai Sor Vorapin || Lumpinee Stadium || Bangkok, Thailand || Decision (Unanimous) || 5 || 3:00
|-  style="background:#fbb;"
| 1998-11-14 || Loss ||align=left| Jomhod Kiatadisak || Muay Thai Champions League || Amsterdam, Netherlands || TKO || 3 || 
|-
! style=background:white colspan=9 |
|-  style="background:#cfc;"
| 1998-11-14 || Win ||align=left| Jerry Morris || Muay Thai Champions League || Amsterdam, Netherlands || Decision (Unanimous) || 3 || 3:00
|-
! style=background:white colspan=9 |
|-  style="background:#cfc;"
| 1998-08-28 || Win ||align=left| Orono Por Muang Ubon || Wan Songchai Promotions || Bangkok, Thailand || Decision || 5 || 3:00
|-  style="background:#cfc;"
| 1998-08-09 || Win ||align=left| Sam Soliman || Thailand vs Australia || Australia || Decision (Unanimous) || 5 || 3:00
|-  style="background:#cfc;"
| 1998-07-19 || Win ||align=left| Orono Por Muang Ubon || ITV  || Chachoengsao, Thailand || Decision || 5 || 3:00
|-
! style=background:white colspan=9 |
|-  style="background:#c5d2ea;"
| 1998-06-27 || Draw ||align=left| Orono Por Muang Ubon ||Lumpinee Stadium || Bangkok, Thailand || Decision || 5 || 3:00
|-  style="background:#cfc;"
| 1998-05-02 || Win ||align=left| Hassan Kassrioui || Muay Thai Champions League || Amsterdam, Netherlands || KO (Right Hook) || 2 || 
|-  style="background:#cfc;"
| 1998-05-02 || Win ||align=left| Gerold Mamadeus || Muay Thai Champions League || Amsterdam, Netherlands || Decision || 3 || 3:00
|-  style="background:#cfc;"
| 1998-03-21 || Win ||align=left| Orono Por Muang Ubon || Lumpinee Stadium || Bangkok, Thailand || Decision || 5 || 3:00
|-  style="background:#fbb;"
| 1997-11-11 || Loss ||align=left| Kriengkrai Sor Vorapin || Lumpinee Stadium  || Bangkok, Thailand || Decision ||5  || 3:00 
|-  style="background:#cfc;"
| 1997-10-05 || Win ||align=left| Dany Bill ||  || Paris, France || Decision (Split) || 5 || 3:00
|-
! style=background:white colspan=9 |
|-  style="background:#cfc;"
| 1997-02-28 || Win ||align=left| Pairot Wor.Wolapon || Lumpinee Stadium || Bangkok, Thailand || TKO (High kick)|| 3 || 
|-  style="background:#cfc;"
| 1997-02-08 || Win ||align=left| Namkabuan Nongkeepahuyuth|| || Phichit province, Thailand || KO (Punches) || 1 || 2:08
|-  style="background:#cfc;"
| 1996-12-17 || Win ||align=left| Wanlop Sor Satpahrn || Lumpinee Stadium || Bangkok, Thailand || Decision (Unanimous) || 5 || 3:00
|-  style="background:#fbb;"
| 1996-10-26 || Loss ||align=left| Pairot Wor.Wolapon || Beer Chang Tournament, Final || Bangkok, Thailand || Decision  || 5 || 3:00
|-  style="background:#cfc;"
| 1996-09-21 || Win ||align=left| Sangtiennoi Sor.Rungroj || Beer Chang Tournament, Semi Final || Bangkok, Thailand || Decision  || 5 || 3:00
|-  style="background:#cfc;"
| 1996-09-01 || Win ||align=left| Marino Deflorin || K-1 Revenge 1996 || Japan || Decision (Unanimous) || 5 || 3:00
|-  style="background:#cfc;"
| 1996-08-03 || Win ||align=left| Jongsanan Fairtex || Beer Chang Tournament || Bangkok, Thailand || KO || 3 || 3:00
|-  style="background:#cfc;"
| 1996-06-29 || Win ||align=left| Pairot Wor.Wolapon || Beer Chang Tournament || Bangkok, Thailand || Decision  || 5 || 3:00
|-  style="background:#fbb;"
| 1996-05-18 || Loss ||align=left| Namkabuan Nongkeepahuyuth|| Beer Chang Tournament || Bangkok, Thailand || Decision  || 5 || 3:00
|-  style="background:#cfc;"
| 1996-03-31 || Win ||align=left| Ivan Hippolyte || || Pattaya, Thailand || Decision (Unanimous) || 5 || 3:00
|-
! style=background:white colspan=9 |
|-  style="background:#fbb;"
| 1995-04-25 || Loss||align=left| Jongsanan Fairtex || Lumpinee Stadium || Bangkok, Thailand || KO || 2 || 
|-  style="background:#cfc;"
| 1995-02-04|| Win ||align=left| Sangtiennoi Sor.Rungroj || Lumpinee Stadium || Bangkok, Thailand || Decision  || 5 || 3:00
|-  style="background:#cfc;"
| 1995-01-09 || Win||align=left| Jongsanan Fairtex || Lumpinee Stadium || Bangkok, Thailand || KO || 4 ||
|-  style="background:#cfc;"
| 1994-11-18|| Win ||align=left| Sangtiennoi Sor.Rungroj || Lumpinee Stadium || Bangkok, Thailand || Decision  || 5 || 3:00
|-  style="background:#cfc;"
| 1994-10-04|| Win ||align=left| Namkabuan NongkeePrayuth || Lumpinee Stadium || Bangkok, Thailand || Decision  || 5 || 3:00
|-  style="background:#cfc;"
| 1994-09-09|| Win ||align=left| Namkabuan NongkeePrayuth || Lumpinee Stadium || Bangkok, Thailand || Decision || 5 || 3:00
|-  style="background:#cfc;"
| 1994-|| Win||align=left| Chandet Sor Prantalay|| Lumpinee Stadium || Bangkok, Thailand || Decision  || 5 || 3:00
|-  style="background:#fbb;"
| 1994- || Loss||align=left| Jongsanan Fairtex || Lumpinee Stadium || Bangkok, Thailand || KO || 1 ||
|-  style="background:#cfc;"
| 1994- || Win ||align=left| Panomrunglek Chor Sawat || Lumpinee Stadium || Bangkok, Thailand || Decision || 5 || 3:00
|-  style="background:#fbb;"
| 1994-02-13|| Loss ||align=left| Chandet Sor Prantalay|| Lumpinee Stadium || Bangkok, Thailand || Decision  || 5 || 3:00
|-
! style=background:white colspan=9 |
|-  style="background:#cfc;"
| 1994-01-08 || Win ||align=left| Panomroonglek Chor Sawat || Lumpinee Stadium || Bangkok, Thailand || Decision || 5 || 3:00 
|-
! style=background:white colspan=9 |
|-  style="background:#fbb;"
| 1993-10-30 || Loss||align=left| Jongsanan Fairtex || Lumpinee Stadium || Bangkok, Thailand || Decision || 5 || 3:00 
|-  style="background:#cfc;"
| 1993-10-05 || Win ||align=left| Jongsanan Fairtex || Lumpinee Stadium || Bangkok, Thailand || Decision || 5 || 3:00 

|-  style="background:#cfc;"
| ? || Win ||align=left| Leo de Snoo || || Uttaradit province, Thailand || Decision || 5 || 3:00

|-  style="background:#cfc;"
| 1993-07-30 || Win ||align=left| Panomroonglek Chor Sawat || Lumpinee Stadium || Bangkok, Thailand || Decision || 5 || 3:00 
|-  style="background:#cfc;"
| 1993-06-11 || Win ||align=left| Chanchai Sor Tamarangsri || Lumpinee Stadium || Bangkok, Thailand || Decision  || 5 || 3:00
|-  style="background:#fbb;"
| 1993-05-04 || Loss ||align=left| Jongsanan Fairtex || Lumpinee Stadium || Bangkok, Thailand || Decision  || 5 || 3:00
|-  style="background:#fbb;"
| 1993-03-29 || Loss||align=left| Namkabuan NongkeePrayuth|| Lumpinee Stadium || Bangkok, Thailand || Decision  || 5 || 3:00
|-  style="background:#cfc;"
| 1993-01-29 || Win ||align=left| Nuathoranee Thongracha|| Lumpinee Stadium || Bangkok, Thailand || Decision || 5 || 3:00
|-  style="background:#cfc;"
| 1992-12-05 || Win ||align=left| Chanchai Sor Tamarangsri|| Lumpinee Stadium || Bangkok, Thailand || Decision || 5 || 3:00 
|-  style="background:#cfc;"
| 1992-10-28 || Win ||align=left| Samaiseuk Por.Pleumkamol || Lumpinee Stadium || Bangkok, Thailand || Decision || 5 || 3:00
|-  style="background:#fbb;"
| 1992-09- || Loss ||align=left| Sangtiennoi Sor.Rungroj || Lumpinee Stadium  || Bangkok, Thailand || Decision  || 5 || 3:00
|-  style="background:#fbb;"
| 1992-08- || Loss ||align=left| Cherry Sor Wanich || Lumpinee Stadium || Bangkok, Thailand || Decision  || 5 || 3:00
|-  style="background:#cfc;"
| 1992-07-21 || Win ||align=left| Orono Por Muang Ubon || Lumpinee Stadium || Bangkok, Thailand || Decision  || 5 || 3:00
|-  style="background:#cfc;"
| 1992-06-30 || Win ||align=left| Chanchai Sor Tamarangsri|| Lumpinee Stadium || Bangkok, Thailand || Decision || 5 || 3:00
|-  style="background:#cfc;"
| 1992-05-29 || Win ||align=left| Nongmoon Chomphutong || Lumpinee Stadium || Bangkok, Thailand || Decision || 5|| 3:00
|-  style="background:#fbb;"
| 1993-07-30 || Loss||align=left| Panomroonglek Chor Sawat || Lumpinee Stadium || Bangkok, Thailand || Decision || 5 || 3:00 
|-  style="background:#fbb;"
| 1992-02-21 || Loss ||align=left| Namkabuan NongkeePrayuth|| Lumpinee Stadium || Bangkok, Thailand || Decision  || 5 || 3:00
|-  style="background:#cfc;"
| 1992-01-21 || Win ||align=left| Cherry Sor Wanich || Lumpinee Stadium || Bangkok, Thailand || Decision  || 5 || 3:00
|-  style="background:#cfc;"
| 1991-11-26 || Win ||align=left| Ramon Dekkers || Lumpinee Stadium || Bangkok, Thailand || Decision (Unanimous) || 5 || 3:00
|-  style="background:#fbb;"
| 1991-08-24 || Loss ||align=left| Samransak Muangsurin|| Lumpinee Stadium || Bangkok, Thailand || KO (Punches) || 2 || 
|-  style="background:#fbb;"
| 1991-10-05 || Loss ||align=left| Nongmoon Chomphutong || Lumpinee Stadium || Bangkok, Thailand || Decision || 5|| 3:00
|-  bgcolor="#cfc"
| 1991-|| Win ||align=left| Coban Lookchaomaesaitong || Lumpinee Stadium || Bangkok, Thailand || Decision || 5 || 3:00
|-  style="background:#fbb;"
| 1991-06-27 || Loss ||align=left| Sanit Wichitkriagkrai || Lumpinee Stadium || Bangkok, Thailand || Decision || 5 || 3:00 
|-  style="background:#cfc;"
| 1991-05-29 || Win||align=left| Nongmoon Chomphutong || Lumpinee Stadium || Bangkok, Thailand || Decision || 5|| 3:00
|-  style="background:#cfc;"
| 1991-02-12 || Win ||align=left| Sanit Wichitkriagkrai || Lumpinee Stadium || Bangkok, Thailand || Decision || 5 || 3:00

|-  style="background:#fbb;"
| 1990- || Loss ||align=left| Nuathoranee Thongracha|| Lumpinee Stadium || Bangkok, Thailand || Decision || 5 || 3:00
|-  style="background:#fbb;"
| 1990-09-01 || Loss||align=left| Kongtoranee Payakaroon || Lumpinee Stadium || Bangkok, Thailand || KO (Low kick + Right Hook)||  3||
|-  style="background:#c5d2ea;"
| 1990-07-21 || Draw ||align=left| Thanooin Chor.Cheuchat|| Lumpinee Stadium || Bangkok, Thailand || Decision || 5 || 3:00
|-  style="background:#fbb;"
| 1990-04-30 || Loss ||align=left| Pairot Wor.Walapon|| Rajadamnern Stadium || Bangkok, Thailand || Decision || 5 || 3:00
|-  style="background:#cfc;"
| 1989-10-06 || Win ||align=left| Mathee Jeedipitak || Lumpinee Stadium || Bangkok, Thailand || Decision (Unanimous) || 5 || 3:00
|-  style="background:#cfc;"
| 1989-07-11 || Win ||align=left| Rungrat Srisunchai || Lumpinee Stadium || Bangkok, Thailand || Decision  || 5 || 3:00
|-  style="background:#cfc;"
| 1989-06-13 || Win||align=left| Orono Por Muang Ubon || Lumpinee Stadium || Bangkok, Thailand || Decision  || 5 || 3:00
|-  style="background:#fbb;"
| 1989-05-15 || Loss ||align=left| Orono Por Muang Ubon || Rajadamnern Stadium || Bangkok, Thailand || Decision  || 5 || 3:00
|-  style="background:#c5d2ea;"
| 1989-02-17 || Draw||align=left| Playchumphon Sor.Prantalay || Lumpinee Stadium || Bangkok, Thailand || Decision  || 5 || 3:00
|-  style="background:#cfc;"
| 1988-12-16 || Win ||align=left| Rungritnoi Daorungomnoi || Lumpinee Stadium || Bangkok, Thailand || Decision  || 5 || 3:00
|-
| colspan=9 | Legend:

See also 
List of K-1 events
List of male kickboxers

References

Living people
Middleweight kickboxers
Welterweight kickboxers
Sakmongkol Sithchuchok
1973 births
Sakmongkol Sithchuchok

th: